The Northern Cape Department of Social Development is the department of the Government of the Northern Cape, responsible for providing social development, protection, and welfare services to the population of the Northern Cape province of South Africa. The political head of the department is the MEC for Social Development; as of 2020 this position is held by Nontobeko Vilakazi.

References

External links
Official website

Government of the Northern Cape
Social security in South Africa
Ministries established in 1994